Albert  Ganzenmüller (born 25 February 1905 in Passau – died 20 March 1996 in Munich) was a German Nazi and, as the Under-secretary of State at the Reich Transport Ministry, was involved in the deportation of German Jews.

Career 
Albert Ganzenmüller had taken part in the Munich Beer Hall Putsch in November 1923 while still at Realgymnasium (secondary high school).  Afterwards, he became a holder of the Blood Order of the German Nazi Party.  After graduating from the Technical College in Munich (now Technical University Munich), where he was a member of a student fraternity known as the Corps Rheno-Palatia München, he became an executive with the Deutsche Reichsbahn (German State Railways) in 1931 and joined the Nazi Party and the Sturmabteilung (SA or “brownshirts”).  In 1940, he had reached the rank of colonel on the staff of the SA supreme command. He held a doctorate degree in Engineering.

In 1934 Ganzenmüller became a senior railway executive (Reichsbahn-Rat) in Munich and in 1938 was appointed Senior Government Adviser (Oberregierungsrat).  He was subsequently head (Dezernent) of electrical engineering at the central office of the German State Railways in Munich.  In 1940 he took over the repair and renewal of the electric railway network in occupied France.  The following year, at his own request, he was transferred to the Eastern Division at Poltava in central Ukraine.

Ganzenmüller quickly restored railroad traffic between Minsk and Smolensk.  On the recommendation of Albert Speer in May 1942, Ganzenmüller was appointed Deputy General Director of the German State Railways and Under-secretary of State at the Reich Transport Ministry, Dr. Julius Dorpmüller.

Involvement in deportations 

Ganzenmüller was immediately involved in the organization of trains for deportation. He collaborated in the transportation scheme for elderly German Jews to Theresienstadt and ensured the smooth running of transport to the extermination camps set up under Operation Reinhardt. On 16 July 1942, Karl Wolff, the Personal Adjutant to Heinrich Himmler, complained to the newly appointed under-secretary about irregular transport and track repairs on the line to the extermination camp at Sobibor.  Ganzenmüller replied in writing on 28 July 1942 as follows:
A train carrying 5,000 Jews has run daily since 22 July from Warsaw to Treblinka via Malkinia; furthermore, another train has run twice a week with 5,000 Jews from Przemysl to Belzec. The senior management of the eastern division of the railways, ‘Gedob’ (Generaldirektion der Ostbahnen), is in constant touch with the security service (Sicherheitsdienst) in Krakau.  The latter is in agreement that transport from Warsaw to Sobibor via Lublin should continue while the reconstruction work on this stretch renders such movements impossible ([until] approximately October 1942).

Karl Wolff thanked him on 13 August 1942 in a personal letter:
… I note with particular pleasure from your communication that a train with 5,000 members of the chosen race has been running daily for 14 days and that we are accordingly in a position to continue with this population movement at an accelerated pace. […]

At the beginning of 1943, Himmler approached Ganzenmüller directly in order to ensure the pending “removal of Jews” to the Auschwitz concentration camp.
Most of the victims were carried to their deaths by Reichsbahn trains in locked and windowless cattle wagons, with few sanitary arrangements and little or nothing in the way of water or food. The wagons were supposed to carry just 50 persons but were normally packed with 100 to 150 victims, the overcrowding making sitting impossible and increasing their distress. The Holocaust trains were hired by Adolf Eichmann, and the Reichsbahn demanded one-way fares be paid by the victims, although children below the age of four were allowed free travel to their deaths. The trains traveled to local death camps in Poland at Chelmno, Belzec, Treblinka, Majdanek and Auschwitz-Birkenau, but the early trains in 1939 and 1940 also traveled to Nazi ghettos in the east, and the victims were usually murdered there by Einsatzgruppen organized by Reinhard Heydrich. Conditions on the Holocaust trains were so bad that many passengers died en route to the death camps especially as it often took many days to reach their destinations. The cattle cars in which the victims were carried were completely unheated in winter and unventilated in hot weather and so the passengers were exposed to either hypothermia or heat stroke. Deaths among the elderly, children, and sick were common. To maintain the deception, some passengers were given postcards by the guards to send to their relatives with dictated words about their successful "resettlement". That deception continued even to the death camps, such as with a bogus station at Treblinka and Sobibor camps that was complete with signs and flower tubs to reassure the victims who debouched there.

Postwar 
Ganzenmüller escaped to Argentina via Italy from the interrogation camp in 1945. His denazification process was delayed, and in 1952 an amnesty led to the ending of the case against him.  He returned to Germany in 1955 and was employed as a planning engineer for transport matters by Hoesch AG. The public prosecutor's office continued to investigate him after 1957, as the exchange of correspondence with Wolff and Himmler had been discovered and published by the historian Gerald Reitlinger. Ganzenmüller remained on remand for ten weeks but the investigations led only to a preferred charge.  In 1973 a case was brought by the regional court at Düsseldorf.  The charge was that by organising transport the 68-year-old Ganzenmüller had aided and abetted the murder of millions of Jewish men, women and children whose wrongful detention had resulted in death. The case was provisionally halted in 1973 because of his inability to follow the case and then terminated altogether in 1977.

Awards and decorations
 Knight's Cross of the War Merit Cross with Swords (19 September 1943)
 Blood Order number 1411933 (1933)

See also
Julius Dorpmüller, Reich Transport Minister in 1945
Sonderzüge in den Tod, a touring exhibition, 2008
Holocaust trains

References

Bibliography
 Raul Hilberg: Sonderzüge nach Auschwitz. Mainz 1981, 
 Heiner Lichtenstein: Mit der Reichsbahn in den Tod: Massentransporte in den Holocaust 1941–1945. Köln 1985,  (Prozess S. 120–130)
  Alfred Gottwaldt, Diana Schulle: „Juden ist die Benutzung von Speisewagen untersagt“: Die antijüdische Politik des Reichsverkehrsministeriums zwischen 1933 und 1945; Forschungsgutachten. Teetz 2007,  (bes. S. 105–112)

External links 
 KZ-Züge auf der Heidebahn, Kapitel 14
 Rechtspolitische Initiative zum Fall Albert Ganzenmüller / Bernd Michael Uhl
 

This is a translation of the article on the German Wikipedia at :de:Albert Ganzenmüller

1905 births
1996 deaths
People from Passau
Sturmabteilung officers
Holocaust perpetrators in Czechoslovakia
Technical University of Munich alumni
Recipients of the Knights Cross of the War Merit Cross
People from the Kingdom of Bavaria
Romani genocide perpetrators
Holocaust perpetrators in Poland
Nazis in South America
Nazis who participated in the Beer Hall Putsch